3031 Houston, provisional designation , is a stony Florian asteroid from the inner regions of the asteroid belt, approximately 6 kilometers in diameter. It was discovered on 8 February 1984, by American astronomer Edward Bowell at Anderson Mesa Station near Flagstaff, Arizona. It was named after American amateur astronomer Walter Scott Houston.

Orbit and classification 

Houston is a member of the Flora family, a giant asteroid family and the largest family of stony asteroids in the main-belt. It orbits the Sun in the inner main-belt at a distance of 2.0–2.5 AU once every 3 years and 4 months (1,221 days). Its orbit has an eccentricity of 0.10 and an inclination of 4° with respect to the ecliptic.

Physical characteristics 

Houston is an assumed S-type asteroid, in line with the Flora family's overall spectral type.

Rotation period 

In April 2011, a rotational lightcurve of Houston was obtained from photometric observations by astronomers at the Oakley Southern Sky Observatory in Australia. Lightcurve analysis gave a well-defined rotation period of 11.218 hours with a brightness amplitude of 0.11 magnitude. Two more lightcurves obtained at the Palomar Transient Factory in 2014, gave a period of 5.61 (half the period solution) and 11.175 hours with an amplitude of 0.17 and 0.14 magnitude, respectively.

Diameter and albedo 

According to the survey carried out by the NEOWISE mission of NASA's Wide-field Infrared Survey Explorer, Houston measures between 5.45 and 6.761 kilometers in diameter  and its surface has an albedo between 0.2456 and 0.39.

The Collaborative Asteroid Lightcurve Link assumes an albedo of 0.24 – derived from 8 Flora, the largest member and namesake of the Flora family – and calculates a diameter of 7.14 kilometers based on an absolute magnitude of 12.9.

Naming 

This minor planet was named after Walter Scott Houston (1912–1993), an American amateur astronomer best known for his column "Deep-Sky Wonders" in the Sky and Telescope magazine. Houston, who observed deep-sky objects, has also encouraged many amateur astronomers.

The name was proposed by the discoverer following a suggestion by P. L. Dombrowski. The official naming citation was published by the Minor Planet Center on 22 June 1986.

References

External links 
 Asteroid Lightcurve Database (LCDB), query form (info )
 Dictionary of Minor Planet Names, Google books
 Asteroids and comets rotation curves, CdR – Observatoire de Genève, Raoul Behrend
 Discovery Circumstances: Numbered Minor Planets (1)-(5000) – Minor Planet Center
 
 

003031
Discoveries by Edward L. G. Bowell
Named minor planets
19840208